Hubbard Township is the name of a few townships in the United States:

Hubbard Township, Hubbard County, Minnesota
Hubbard Township, Polk County, Minnesota
Hubbard Township, Trumbull County, Ohio

Township name disambiguation pages